The Red Sea Riviera, Egypt's eastern coastline along the Red Sea, consists of resort cities on the western shore of the Gulf of Aqaba and along the eastern coast of mainland Egypt, south of the Gulf of Suez. The combination of a favorable climate, warm sea, thousands of kilometers of shoreline, and abundant natural and archaeological points of interest makes this stretch of Egypt's coastline a popular national and international tourist destination. There are numerous National Parks along the Red Sea Riviera, both underwater and on land. Desert and marine life are protected by several laws, and visitors may be subject to heavy fines for not abiding.

List of resorts
Listed in geographic order, from north to south:

On the Sinai Peninsula:
 Dahab
 Nuweiba
 Ras Muhammad National Park
 Ras Sedr
 Sharm El Sheikh
 Straits of Tiran
 Taba

Sinai's nearby islands include:
 Pharaoh's Island
 Sanafir Island
 Tiran Island

On the Western Red Sea shore:
 Abu Shar
 Abu Soma
 Abu Tig (El Gouna)
 Ain Sukhna
 Quseir
 Coraya Bay
 Alshalateen
 Berenice Troglodytica
 El Gouna
 Foul Bay
 Gamsha Bay
 Gebel Elba
 Gubal Strait
 Hala'ib
 Hamata
 Hurghada
 Makadi Bay
 Marsa Alam
 Tarabin town
 Port Ghalib (fr)
 Ras Banas
 Ras Gharib
 Safaga
 Sahl Hasheesh
 Serrenia
 Shoni Bay
 Soma Bay
 Wadi Gimal

Red Sea islands include:
 Abu Minqar Island
 Green Island (Egypt)
 Mukawwa Island
 Rocky Island
 Shadwan
 St. John's Island, Egypt

See also
 Northern coast of Egypt
 Riviera

References

External links
 Red Sea Riviera
 AbuSoma.com

 
Red Sea
Seaside resorts in Egypt
Red Sea Governorate
South Sinai Governorate